The Treaty of Medina del Campo was signed on 30 October 1431. It was a peace treaty between the Crown of Castile and the Kingdom of Portugal. The agreement was ratified in Almeirim in January 1432.

See also
The treaty put an end to a long period of confrontations going back to the 1383–1385 Crisis and allowed both countries to resume settling and economic development along their shared border.

See also
List of treaties

External links
Relations between Portugal and Castile in the Late Middle Ages: 13th - 16th Centuries

1431 in Portugal
Medina del Camp
Medina del Campo (1431)
Medina del Campo (1431)
Medina del Campo
1431 in Europe
15th century in Castile
Medina del Campo